The Continental O-520 is a six-cylinder, horizontally opposed aircraft engine produced by Teledyne Continental Motors. First run in 1963 as a development of the IO-346, it has been produced in versions incorporating fuel injection (IO-520), turbo-charging (TSIO-520), and gearing (GTSIO-520).

Design and development

The IO-520 series engines normally produce  and are used in numerous aircraft such as certain models of the Bellanca Viking 300 and Super Viking, the Beech Bonanza and Baron, and Cessna 185- 206-, 210-, 310-, and 400-series aircraft.  The IO-520 remained in production in 2019.

The 'G' prefix indicated the incorporation of propeller reduction gearing.

Variants

IO-520
IO-520-A 285 hp (213 kW) (Meyers 200)
IO-520-B 285 hp (213 kW) (Beech 35-C33A Debonair, s35, model 36 Bonanza)
IO-520-BA 285 hp (213 kW)
IO-520-BB 285 hp (213 kW)
IO-520-C 285 hp (213 kW)
IO-520-CB 285 hp (213 kW)
IO-520-D 300 hp (224 kW)
IO-520-E 300 hp (224 kW)
IO-520-F 300 hp (224 kW)
IO-520-J 285 hp (213 kW)
IO-520-K 300 hp (224 kW) (Bellanca Viking)
IO-520-L 300 hp (224 kW)
IO-520-M 285 hp (213 kW)
IO-520-MB 285 hp (213 kW)
IO-520-N 300 hp (224 kW)
IO-520-NB 300 hp (224 kW)
L/IO-520-P

TSIO-520
TSIO-520-A 
TSIO-520-AE 
LTSIO-520-AE 
TSIO-520-AF 
TSIO-520-B 285 hp (213 kW)
TSIO-520-BB 285 hp (213 kW)
TSIO-520-BE 
TSIO-520-C 
TSIO-520-CE 
TSIO-520-D  285 hp (213 kW)
TSIO-520-DB  285 hp (213 kW)
TSIO-520-E 
TSIO-520-EB 
TSIO-520-G 285 hp (213 kW)
TSIO-520-H 
TSIO-520-J 310 hp (230 kW)
TSIO-520-JB 310 hp (230 kW)
TSIO-520-K 285 hp (213 kW)
TSIO-520-KB 285 hp (213 kW)
TSIO-520-L 310 hp (230 kW)
TSIO-520-LB 310 hp (230 kW)
TSIO-520-M  285 hp (213 kW)
TSIO-520-N 310 hp (230 kW)
TSIO-520-NB 310 hp (230 kW)
TSIO-520-P 310 hp (230 kW)
TSIO-520-R 310 hp (230 kW)
TSIO-520-T 310 hp (230 kW)
TSIO-520-U 
TSIO-520-UB 
TSIO-520-VB 
TSIO-520-WB

GTSIO-520
GTSIO-520-C 
GTSIO-520-D 375 hp (280 kW) (Cessna 421)
GTSIO-520-F 
GTSIO-520-H 375 hp (280 kW) (Cessna 421B)
GTSIO-520-K 
GTSIO-520-L 375 hp (280 kW) (Cessna 421C)
GTSIO-520-M 375 hp (280 kW) (Cessna 404)
GTSIO-520-N 375 hp (280 kW) (Cessna 421C)
GTSIO-520-S 375 hp (280 kW) (Tecnam P2012 Traveller)

Applications

Specifications (GTSIO-520-D)

See also
 List of aircraft engines

References

External links

1960s aircraft piston engines
O-520